Bash Qaleh Rural District is in the Central District of Urmia County, West Azerbaijan province, Iran. At the National Census of 2006, its population was 9,862 in 2,681 households. There were 9,994 inhabitants in 2,830 households at the following census of 2011. At the most recent census of 2016, the population of the rural district was 10,043 in 3,033 households. The largest of its 47 villages was Tupraq Qaleh, with 2,467 people.

References 

Urmia County

Rural Districts of West Azerbaijan Province

Populated places in West Azerbaijan Province

Populated places in Urmia County